Incisive is a suite of tools from Cadence Design Systems related to the design and verification of ASICs, SoCs, and FPGAs. Incisive is commonly referred to by the name NCSim in reference to the core simulation engine. In the late 1990s, the tool suite was known as ldv (logic design and verification).

Depending on the design requirements, Incisive has many different bundling options of the following tools:

See also 

 List of HDL simulators

Electronic design automation software
Logic design